A 1899 marble sculpture of Ulysses S. Grant by Franklin Simmons is installed in the United States Capitol's rotunda, in Washington, D.C.

See also
 Ulysses S. Grant Memorial on Capitol Hill
 List of sculptures of presidents of the United States

References

1899 sculptures
Cultural depictions of Ulysses S. Grant
Monuments and memorials in Washington, D.C.
Sculptures of men in Washington, D.C.
United States Capitol statues
Statues of Ulysses S. Grant